Ruggerio is a surname. Notable people with the surname include:

 David Ruggerio (born 1962), American chef, author and television personality
 Dominick J. Ruggerio (born 1948), American politician

See also
 Ruggero